The Marquesas Islands have a diverse flora, with a high rate of endemism.  They are in the floristic Polynesian subkingdom of the Oceanian realm.

Food Plants
Most of the food plants are not endemic, and include:  
Avocados
Bananas
Breadfruit (mei) from which "mā" is made.
Cashews
Coconuts
Jambul
Grapefruits
Guavas
Lemons
Mangos
Pandanus
Papayas
Pineapples
Plantains
Soursops
Sugar apples
Taro (tao) from which "poke", similar to poi, is made.
Vanilla

Other plants
Frangipani
Hibiscus
Mape
Nono
Tiara

Pelagodoxa henryana, the only species in the genus Pelagodoxa, is a palm tree that is endemic to the Marquesas Islands.

See also
Marquesan Nature Reserves

References

External links
Botany.si.edu: Flora of the Marquesas Islands website

 
F
Marquesas Islands
Marquesas Islands
Marquesas